Lachnum is a genus of fungi in the family Hyaloscyphaceae. The genus contains about 251 species. It was circumscribed by Swedish botanist Anders Jahan Retzius in 1795.

Species

L. abnorme
L. acerinum
L. agaricinum
L. apalum (rush disco)
L. barbatum
L. berggrenii
L. bicolor
L. brevipilosum
L. brevipilum
L. britzelmayrionum
L. callimorphum
L. calycioides
L. capitatum
L. caricis
L. carneolum
L. clandestinum
L. clavigerum
L. clavisporum
L. coeruleoalbum
L. controversum
L. correae
L. corticale
L. cruciferum
L. crystallinum
L. deflexum
L. diminutum
L. echinulatum
L. elongatisporum
L. enzenspergerianum
L. fasciculare
L. flavofuligineum
L. fuscescens
L. hyalopus
L. imbecille
L. juncinum
L. lachnoides
L. lanariceps
L. latebricola
L. luteovinosum
L. luzulinum
L. melanophthalmum
L. nipponicum
L. nothofagi
L. nudipes
L. palearum
L. palmae
L. papyraceum
L. perplexum
L. pritzelianum
L. pseudolachnum
L. pteridicola
L. pteridophyllum
L. pudibundum
L. pulchellum
L. pulverulentum
L. pygmaeum
L. radotinense
L. rehmii
L. rhodoleucum
L. rhytismatis
L. roridum
L. salicariae
L. sesleriae
L. soppittii
L. spadiceum
L. subnudipes
L. sulphureum
L. tenuissimum
L. trapeziforme
L. varians
L. virgineum
L. willisii

References

Hyaloscyphaceae
Helotiales genera
Taxa named by Anders Jahan Retzius